Brayan Arley Gómez Ramírez (born 29 January 2000) is a Colombian professional footballer who plays as an attacking midfielder for USL Championship side Real Monarchs SLC.

Club career
Gómez began his career with Atlético Nacional, before moving to Deportivo Pasto in search of first team football. In January 2021, it was announced Gómez had joined USL Championship side Real Monarchs SLC, with Deportivo Pasto keeping 50% of the player's rights for any future sale.

International career
Gómez was part of  the Colombia under-17 team at the 2017 FIFA U-17 World Cup squad, appearing in all three group stage matches. In the 2017 U-17 South American Championships, he also tallied two assists in five appearances to help Colombia to a fourth-place finish.

References

2000 births
Association football midfielders
Atlético Nacional footballers
Colombia youth international footballers
Colombian expatriate footballers
Colombian footballers
Deportivo Pasto footballers
Expatriate soccer players in the United States
Living people
People from Medellín
Real Monarchs players
USL Championship players